Andrew Rosen is an American retail executive. Currently C.E.O. of Theory, Inc., a New York-based clothing retailer he co-founded in 1997, Rosen is a third-generation garment industry entrepreneur. Rosen has served for years as a judge in the CFDA Fashion Awards, and as a mentor to many of its finalists. Rosen has been a key investor in a number of emerging American designers, including Alice + Olivia, J Brand, rag & bone, and Proenza Schouler.

Early life
Rosen grew up immersed in the New York City garment industry. His first job was in a knitting mill on Long Island, operating punch cards. His grandfather Arthur Rosen, a Russian immigrant and a skilled garment cutter, founded the Puritan Dress Company in 1910 in Waltham, Massachusetts. His son Carl took over the business in the 1950s, and relocated it to New York City's department store district.
Carl Rosen changed the company's name to the Puritan Fashions Corporation.

In 1977 Carl Rosen produced the first designer jeans, with a license from Calvin Klein. Barry Schwartz, Klein's business partner at the time, told the Wall Street Journal: Carl proposed giving us $1 for a $18.75 pair of jeans that sold for $40 retail…we wound up selling 15 million pairs a year at the peak.  Puritan continued to license merchandise with other designers, including a clothing line with Diane von Furstenberg. By Carl Rosen's death in 1983, the company's sales totaled nearly $300 million.

Corporate career
Andrew Rosen dropped out college after one year at the University of Miami.
At 26, Rosen took over as C.E.O. of Puritan after his father's death, but oversaw flagging profits. Calvin Klein and Barry Schwartz acquired the company after a year, inviting Rosen to stay on as an executive, and four years later named him company president. Rosen quit Puritan to work as C.E.O. of Anne Klein for six years. According to the New Yorker, he was fired from Anne Klein "because of disagreements over the brand’s strategy”. In 1997, Rosen partnered with the designer Elie Tahari to found Theory. Rosen and Tahari's most important style innovation was the introduction of technically sophisticated stretch fabrics to a modern business silhouette. The Wall Street Journal writes that “Rosen bet that he could build a business on unfussy, well-made pants and shirts with no auteur behind them, and he won big.”  By 2003, the company had annual sales of over $200 million (1), and Rosen and Tahari sold the label to its Japanese licensee, Link Holdings.

Rosen kept an 11 percent stake in the business, however, which he sold once its holding company brought Theory public in 2005. Tahari alleged he was deceived about the terms of the buyout, and sued unsuccessfully for a stake in the IPO proceeds. In 2010, Rosen hired Belgian designer Olivier Theyskens as Theory's creative director. The move was intended to keep Theory competitive with brands like Alexander Wang and 3.1 Phillip Lim, who were making inroads in the ‘contemporary’ market with critically acclaimed designer collections. Theysken left Theory in June 2014, after his capsule collection for the company failed to drive significant sales. Rosen replaced him with former Theory head designer Lisa Kulson.

Support for New York City garment manufacturing

Rosen has been a major supporter of the NYEDC's Fashion Manufacturing Initiative, which aims to strengthen the garment sector in New York City by offering grants, training, and resource-sharing to clothing companies. Rosen's own Theory, Inc. maintains a garment factory on Little West Twelfth Street, close to headquarters, for the production of sample garments.

In 2014, Theory did 30 percent of its manufacturing in New York, and Rosen has expressed interest in bringing more. According to the New Yorker, New York's garment district supported as many as 200,000 jobs fifty years ago. By 2013, this number had fallen to around 21,000. The clothing industry doesn’t have to go to the volume that it used to be, Rosen has said. His aim is that the quality and integrity of our industry is maintained an improved upon. Rosen sees new industry growth coming from luxury apparel manufacturing, a sector which has migrated from New York to cities like Paris and Milan.

Personal life
Rosen is married to Jenny Dyer.  He has two children with his first wife. Ashley Rosen is an athlete and the owner/founder of FULLYcommitted  .  Austin Rosen has worked at Theory and rag & bone, and founded the music management firm Electric Feel.

Rosen is a lifelong horse racing aficionado and owns more than fifty racehorses. His stallion Chief's Crown was a 1984 Breeders' Cup winner.

External links
Theory.com (official web site for Theory, Inc.)
LTH - Link Theory Holdings (official web site for Theory, Inc. parent company)
NYC Economic Development Corporation's Fashion Manufacturing Initiative
 (official website for Ashley Rosen's FULLYcommitted)

References

Living people
American chief executives of fashion industry companies
University of Miami alumni
American retail chief executives
American businesspeople in retailing
Year of birth missing (living people)